Guiré is a small town and rural commune in the Cercle of Nara in the Koulikoro Region of south-western Mali. The commune covers an area of 6,892 square kilometers and extends to the Mauritanian border. It contains 25 villages and had a population of 19,879 in the 2009 census.  The town of Guiré is 90 km southeast of Nara, the administrative centre (chef-lieu) of the cercle.

References

External links
 .

Communes of Koulikoro Region